Ariadne in Hoppegarten is a 1928 German silent sports film directed by Robert Dinesen and starring Alfred Abel, Maria Jacobini and Paul Henckels. It takes place in Hoppegarten, a traditional centre of horseracing in the German capital of Berlin.

The film's sets were designed by Leopold Blonder.

Cast

References

Bibliography

External links

1928 films
Films of the Weimar Republic
German silent feature films
Films directed by Robert Dinesen
Films set in Berlin
German horse racing films
1920s sports films
Bavaria Film films
Films based on German novels
German black-and-white films
1920s German films
1920s German-language films
Silent sports films